The Troféu Cinco Violinos is an annual football tournament held at the Estádio José Alvalade in Lisbon, Portugal. Sporting CP hosts the tournament in early-mid August, one or two weeks before the regular season kicks off. It is named after the "five violins" (cinco violinos): Jesus Correia, Manuel Vasques, Albano, Fernando Peyroteo and José Travassos.

2012

2013

2014

2015

2016

2017

2018

2019

2020 
The 2020 match was called off after several Sporting CP players tested positive for COVID-19.

2021

2022

Performance by team

References 

Portuguese football friendly trophies
Sporting CP
2012 establishments in Portugal
Recurring sporting events established in 2012